Nathaniel Méchaly (born 1972) is a French musician and film composer. His composing credits include Avanim (2004), Revolver (2005), Colombiana (2011), The Grandmaster (2013), and the Taken trilogy (2008–2014).

Early life
Méchaly was born in 1972. He studied music at the Conservatoire National de Région de Musique de Marseille.

Career
Méchaly began his career as a composer for television shows and commercials for French media conglomerates. He served as an assistant to French-Lebanese composer Gabriel Yared.

He wrote his first score for French-Israeli writer and director Raphaël Nadjari's 2004 film Avanim. He went on to score two more Israeli feature films: Ushpizin (2004), and Tehilim (2007) which was also directed by Nadjari. Eventually, the French production company EuropaCorp's music department director became aware of Méchaly's earlier works and referred him to compose French actor Richard Berry's 2005 directorial feature film The Black Box. Afterward, French screenwriter and director Luc Besson, co-founder of EuropaCorp became pleased with Méchaly's work in The Black Box and decided to hire him for future projects.

Méchaly won Best Original Film Score at the 33rd Hong Kong Film Awards and Best Composer at the 8th Asian Film Awards for The Grandmaster (2013) with Japanese composer Shigeru Umebayashi.

Selected filmography

References

External links

1972 births
Living people
French film score composers
French musicians
French male film score composers
Best Original Score Guldbagge Award winners